Bandya Kakade (c. 1945 – 17 October 2012) was an Indian footballer who was second-choice goalkeeper in the Indian squad that won a bronze medal at the 1970 Asian Games in Bangkok. He understudied Kuppuswami Sampath in that competition and he was one of three goalkeepers who represented India in the qualifying competition for the 1972 Olympic Games.

Born in Mumbai to a family of tailors, Bandya Kakade was more interested in football and tennis than studies during his schooldays. He played for a local team, Friends XI, before progressing to the Central Railways club and then, in 1966, to Mafatlal SC. He played for the Indian junior team in 1964 and spent nearly 20 years as goalkeeper with Tata Sports Club from 1970, where he replaced S. S. Narayan. He occasionally played as a right-back and retired from the sport in 1989.

Having suffered paralysis of his right-hand side two years previously, Kakade died of a heart attack in Mumbai on 17 October 2012. He was unmarried.

Honours

India
Asian Games Bronze Medal: 1970

References

Indian footballers
India international footballers
Footballers from Mumbai
2012 deaths
1940s births
Footballers at the 1970 Asian Games
Asian Games medalists in football
Asian Games bronze medalists for India
Association football goalkeepers
Medalists at the 1970 Asian Games
Mumbai Football League players